Panagiotis Vosniadis (born 27 July 1989) is a Greek professional footballer who plays as a goalkeeper for Super League 2 club Kallithea.

Career
On 14 August 2016, he signed a year contract with Panionios, having the opportunity to play for first time in his career for a Super League club.

References

External links
Profile at EPAE.org
Profile at flnews.gr
Interview at mikriliga.com

1989 births
Living people
Greek footballers
Athlitiki Enosi Larissa F.C. players
Iraklis Thessaloniki F.C. players
Panionios F.C. players
Veria NFC players
Association football goalkeepers
Footballers from Thessaloniki